Nalton Womersley (March 1859 – 26 October 1930) was a British tennis player active in the late 19th century. In major tournaments of the time he played at the 1880 Wimbledon Championships where he was beaten in the first round by George Butterworth. Between 1879 and 1882 he won one singles title.

Career
In 1879 Nalton played and won his first tournament at the Essex County Cricket Club Tournament at Leyton, against his younger brother Dale Wormersley. In 1880 he failed to retain his Essex County Cricket Club title losing in the semi finals.

In July 1880 he played at Wimbledon Championships where he was beaten in the first round by George Butterworth. In 1881 he was losing finalist at the Essex Championships at Brentwood, Essex. In 1882 he reached the final of the Essex Championships for the second time, but lost to Charles Walder Grinstead.

Work and Family
Nalton Womersley was the older brother of fellow lawn tennis player Dale Wormersley. who later became a chemicals manufacturer and employer.

References

External links
  Wimbledon: Player Profile: N. Womersley.

1859 births
1930 deaths
19th-century male tennis players
English male tennis players
Tennis people from Essex
British male tennis players